The 2016–17 Middle Tennessee Blue Raiders men's basketball team represented Middle Tennessee State University during the 2016–17 NCAA Division I men's basketball season. The Blue Raiders, led by 15th-year head coach Kermit Davis, played their home games at the Murphy Center in Murfreesboro, Tennessee and were members of Conference USA. They finished the season 31–5, 17–1 in C-USA play to win the regular season championship. In the C-USA tournament, they defeated UTSA, UTEP, and Marshall to win the C-USA Tournament. As a result, they received the conference's automatic bid to the NCAA tournament. As the No. 12 seed in the South region, they defeated Minnesota in the first round before losing in the second round to Butler.

Previous season 
The Blue Raiders finished the 2015–16 season 25–10, 13–5 in C-USA play to finish in second place. They defeated Charlotte, Marshall, and Old Dominion to win the C-USA tournament. As a result, they earned the conference's automatic bid to the NCAA tournament. As a No. 15 seed in the Tournament, they upset No. 2 seed and No. 2-ranked Michigan State in the first round to become only the eighth No. 15 seed to win an NCAA Tournament game. In the Second Round they lost to eventual Final Four participant, Syracuse.

Offseason

Departures

Incoming Transfers

Recruiting class of 2016

Preseason 
The Blue Raiders were picked to finish in second place in the preseason Conference USA poll. Giddy Potts and Reggie Upshaw Jr. were selected to the preseason All-Conference USA team.

Roster

Schedule and results

|-
!colspan=9 style=| Exhibition

|-
!colspan=9 style=| Non-conference regular season

|-
!colspan=9 style=| Conference USA regular season

|-
!colspan=9 style=| Conference USA tournament

|-
!colspan=9 style=| NCAA tournament

Rankings

*AP does not release post-NCAA tournament rankings

References

Middle Tennessee Blue Raiders men's basketball seasons
Middle Tennessee
Middle Tennessee
Middle Tennessee Blue Raiders
Middle Tennessee Blue Raiders